Mawathagama East Grama Niladhari Division is a  Grama Niladhari Division of the  Seethawaka Divisional Secretariat  of Colombo District  of Western Province, Sri Lanka .  It has Grama Niladhari Division Code 444A.

Mawathagama East is a surrounded by the  Pitumpe North, Galagedara East, Galagedara North, Wewelpanawa, Diddeniya South, Kudakanda, Mawathagama West and Thunnana West  Grama Niladhari Divisions.

Demographics

Ethnicity 

The Mawathagama East Grama Niladhari Division has  a Sinhalese majority (98.1%) . In comparison, the Seethawaka Divisional Secretariat (which contains the Mawathagama East Grama Niladhari Division) has  a Sinhalese majority (88.2%)

Religion 

The Mawathagama East Grama Niladhari Division has  a Buddhist majority (94.4%) . In comparison, the Seethawaka Divisional Secretariat (which contains the Mawathagama East Grama Niladhari Division) has  a Buddhist majority (81.5%)

References 

Grama Niladhari Divisions of Seethawaka Divisional Secretariat